State Route 726 (SR 726) is a north–south state highway in western Ohio, a U.S. state. The northern terminus of SR 726 is at a signalized intersection with SR 121 in downtown New Madison.

Route description

SR 726 runs through northern Preble County and southern Darke County.  No portion of this highway is inclusive within the National Highway System.

History
Created in 1937 along the alignment that it occupies to this day between US 127 and SR 121, SR 726 has not experienced any changes of major significance to its routing since inception.

Major intersections

References

726
Transportation in Preble County, Ohio
Transportation in Darke County, Ohio